Zibad (also Romanized as Zībad) is a village in Zibad Rural District, Kakhk District, Gonabad County, Razavi Khorasan Province, Iran. At the 2006 census, its population was 4243, in 1701 families.

Zibad, which means beautiful in Persian, was a famous ancient area in Shahnameh. According to Shahnameh Ferdowsi (around 1000 AD), it was the place of a famous war called Davazdah Rokh(12 hero) between Iran and Turan. Zibad also has an ancient qanat that may be more than 1600 years old.

Zibad famous product
its saffron ,watermelon, melon, rice and in the past also opium production.
its ancient castle which was the shelter of the last emperor of sasanian iran, Yazdegerd III, the place of three ancient wars, and its Mithraism monument.
its Qanat and dar e soufe a famous mountain wall rock, similar to Taq-e Bostan
its water clock which had been in use continuously from 400BCE until 1950.
Its Watermill producing flour and crushed wheat. The ancient water mill was at work until 1984 and destroyed for the construction of a dam.

According to Callisthenes, the Persians were using water clocks in 328BCE to ensure a just and exact distribution of water from qanats to their shareholders for agricultural irrigation. The use of water clocks in Iran, especially in Zibad, dates back to 500BCE. Later they were also used to determine the exact holy days of pre-Islamic religions, such as the Nowruz, Chelah, or Yaldā - the shortest, longest, and equal-length days and nights of the years. The water clocks used in Iran were one of the most practical ancient tools for timing the yearly calendar.
.

Kūh-Zibad
The mountain of Kūh-Zibad is located near Zibad, and is the second-highest mountain in Razavi Khorasan Province.
Kūh-Zibad is famous because of some great historical events.  its peak is called Tir Mahi  The terrain around Kuh-e zibad is mainly hilly. Around Kuh-e Zibad is very sparsely populated, with 5 inhabitants per square kilometre. The neighbourhood around Kuh-e Zibad is barren with little or vegetation. In the neighbourhood around are unusually many named mountains and valleys. 
A cold steppe climate prevailing in the region.
This mountain had been referred in some historical book such as shahnameh in Davazdah Rokhwar as the Zibad mountain and its eastern part is called black mountain or kouh Gonabad. the long-range mountain called Qohestan and It extends from Bajestan to  Birjand near the border with Afghanistan this rang mountain separate south Khorasan from Razavi Khorasan,part of this rang mountain near Kakhk is called black mountain or kouh e gonabad

Zibad Castle
Zibad Castle is one of the four historical monuments of Zibad. It is located in Gonabad and is believed to be the last shelter of the last Sasanian emperor Yazdegerd III. It was registered in 2001 as a national heritage property in Iran, as it is related to the history of pre-Islamic Iran. In addition to the castle of Zibad, there is also the royal castle of Zibad, nationally registered under the name of Shahab Castle in 2002. Sources conflict as to the exact manner of the emperor's final moments. One suggests that after his defeat, he sought refuge at a millers near Marv, who killed Yazdegerd in order to obtain his jewelry, whilst the Cambridge History of Iran states that the miller was sent by Mahoe Suri.  According to the history of Belazari, Yazdegerd III was defeated in a war in the city of Gonabad.

According to the excavations of Zibd-Gonabad Fortress and according to oral narrations and the report of Blazeri and Habib Abdolhai,Dr Ajam and Abas Zmani (historical study magazine 1974),  it seems that the narration related to the murder of Yazdgerd in Merw Mill is more mythical than the truth. What is closer to the truth is the narration of Al-Baladhuri in Kitab Futuh al-Buldan, that he was killed in Gonabad

The main text of Blazeri's book The Fate of Yazdgerd III:

Then he went to Khorasan, then he went to Janabad (Gonabad) he was welcomed and ruler of merv send Nizak Trkhan to welcom him in gonabad. but after weeks he asked the emperor to marry his daughter and the emperor  refused and this caused a war and at the end Nizak attacked and defeated the king army and Destroyed and captured the remnants of the imperial forces. the battle was occurred in Zibad gonabad.
Mahoe Suri was probably from the House of Suren, one of the seven Parthian clans of the Sasanian state. During the Islamic invasion of Iran, Yazdegerd III went to refuge in Marv; in his way to merv he stayed in gonabad  Mahoe envoy warmly received them in gonabad. Mahoe Suri used opportunity to secretly plot with the Hephthalite ruler Nizak against Yazdegerd.

Regardless, the death of Yazdegerd marked the end of the Sasanian Empire, and made it less difficult for the Arabs to conquer the rest of Iran. All of Khorasan was soon conquered by the Arabs, who would use it as a base to attack Transoxiana. The death of Yazdegerd thus marked the end of the last pre-Islamic Iranian empire after more than 400 years of rule. An empire–which had a generation earlier briefly conquered Egypt and Asia Minor, even reaching as a far as Constantinople, fell to a force of lightly equipped Arabs that were used to skirmishes and desert warfare. The heavy Sasanian cavalry was too sluggish and systematized to contain them; employed light-armed Arab or East Iranian mercenaries from Khorasan and Transoxiana would have been much more successful.

Sights and attractions 

Zibad is an ancient place with many historical places. The Davazdah Rokh war had occurred in Zibad.

Sufeh Pir  
Sufeh Pir is another famous place in Zibad, a holy cave believed to be the tomb of Piran Viseh in the Kūh-Zibad mountain. He is a Turanian figure in Shahnameh, the national epic of Greater Iran. Beside Shahnameh, Piran is also mentioned in other sources such as Tabari and Tha'ālibī. He is the king of Khotan and the spahbed of Afrasiab, the king of Turan.

According to the book of Dr. Abas Zamani Piran Viseh was buried in the cave of Sofe Zibad now called DarSufa Pir.

Sarv-e Zibad
It is estimated to be over two millennia old and is likely the second-oldest living lifeform in Iran.
The exact age of the tree has been difficult to determine, but it is estimated to be between around 2000 years old.

Culture

Holding the Yalda Night and festival of Davazdah Rokh is 2 most famous festival of Zibad.
Iranian festivals such as Yaldā Night and Nowruz are celebrated in Zibad.

See also

 Davazdah Rokh
 Gonabad
 Kūh-Zibad
 Razavi Khorasan Province
 Sarv Zibad
 Zibad Castle
 List of oldest trees
 Cypress of Kashmar
 Sarv-e Abarkuh
 Qanat
 Davazdah Rokh
 Kay Khosrow

References

Bibliography
 

 
 

Parssea magazine 
IRNA news agency 
 Baran Kavir magazine No 62 Sarve Zibad Dr.M.Ajam 
 Sarve in iran

External links

Parssea magazine 
IRNA news agency

Gallery 

Populated places in Gonabad County
Shahnameh stories
Gonabad County
Razavi Khorasan Province
Tourist attractions in Razavi Khorasan Province
Individual trees in Iran